Carlos J. Martijena-Carella is a role-playing game designer and novel author.

Career

RPGs
Following an introduction to GURPS in Steve Jackson's Man to Man, C.J. Carella got his start in the role-playing games industry with GURPS Martial Arts (1990) and freelanced for Steve Jackson Games. Carella designed GURPS War Against the Chtorr (1993), which game designer Rick Swan called a "first-rate supplement for the GURPS game". He also wrote GURPS Voodoo: The Shadow War, published in 1995.

Carella was later a Palladium Books staffer. He created the Nightbane setting and was involved in the production of Mercenaries and Pantheons of the Megaverse for Palladium's multigenre RPG RIFTS. Carella also authored Rifts Manhunter (1996) for Myrmidon Press, a cross-over book between Myrmidon's own science-fiction game Manhunter and Rifts. Carella designed the role-playing games CJ Carella's WitchCraft (1996) and Armageddon: The End Times (1997), which were first published by Myrmidon.

Carella developed the Unisystem for the first editions of WitchCraft and Armageddon. Carella had bad experiences with the business end of Myrmidon, and since George Vasilakos and M. Alexander Jurkat of Eden Studios, Inc. were fans of his work, they had talked about doing a Conspiracy X/Witchcraft crossover book.

By 1998, sales on Conspiracy X supplements were slowly dropping and they realized that they needed more lines to revitalize the business. In July 1998, Eden Studios announced that they had come to agreement for an exclusive license to Carella's WitchCraft and Armageddon RPGs. Carella created a simplified variant of Unisystem for the Buffy the Vampire Slayer Roleplaying Game (2002) that he called the "cinematic" system. Carella's Secret of the Ancients (2003) was the final volume of Eden's Odyssey adventures series. Carella also co-designed Eden Studios' RPG Terra Primate.

Novels
The New Olympus Saga:
Armageddon Girl (2012)
Doomsday Duet
Apocalypse Dance
The Ragnorak Alternative(2015)

noir-horror series where unlikely heroes battle an upcoming Lovecraftian apocalypse:
Bad Vibes (2014)
Shadowfall: Las Vegas (2015)
Dante's Demons (2015)

Warp Marine Series: mil-SF with some interesting Lovecraftian elements:
Decisively Engaged (2015)
No Price Too High (2016)
Advance to Contact (2016)
In Dread Silence (2017)
Havoc of War (2017)

References

External links
 Home page
 C.J. Carella :: Pen & Paper RPG Database archive

GURPS writers
Living people
Role-playing game designers
Year of birth missing (living people)